Giovanni XXIII Tunnel (also called Passante a Nord-Ovest) is a road tunnel in Rome, Italy, that is part of the Tangenziale Est road.

The twin tunnels form a dual carriageway running under the Monte Mario hill, connecting the northwest zone to northeast zone of Rome.

The tunnel was officially opened on 22 December 2004.

The tunnel is toll-free.

External links
 

Road tunnels in Italy
Tunnels completed in 2004
Transport in Rome
Rome Q. XIV Trionfale
Rome Q. XV Della Vittoria
Rome Q. XXVII Primavalle